Ichhapur railway station is the railway station in the town of Ichhapur. It serves the local areas of Ichhapur in North 24 Parganas district, West Bengal, India.

History
The Sealdah–Kusthia line of the Eastern Bengal Railway was opened to railway traffic in the year 1862. Eastern Bengal Railway used to work only on the eastern side of the Hooghly River.

Electrification
The Sealdah–Ranaghat sector was electrified in 1963–65.

References

External links

 

Sealdah railway division
Railway stations in North 24 Parganas district
Transport in Kolkata
Kolkata Suburban Railway stations